This Beautiful Fantastic is a 2016 British romantic drama film directed and written by Simon Aboud and starring Jessica Brown Findlay, Tom Wilkinson, Andrew Scott, Jeremy Irvine, Anna Chancellor, and Eileen Davies.

Plot 
Bella Brown is a young woman with obsessive–compulsive disorder. She works in a public library and is trying to write a children’s book. Bella's fear of plants causes her to neglect the garden of her rented house.  Bella meets her next-door-neighbor, a curmudgeonly widower named Alfie Stevenson, and his cook Vernon. After Alfie reports Bella, her landlord gives her one month in which to improve the garden, or face eviction. As Bella works on the garden, she bonds with Alfie, whom Vernon has convinced to help. Alfie helps her find an appreciation for nature. She also starts a romance with Billy, an inventor who frequents the library and who inspires her to begin writing a new story.

A storm destroys most of Bella’s progress on the garden. Billy asks her out on a date, but that day she is fired from her job and then sees Billy with another woman. She falls into a depression. With only a short time left until her landlord's deadline, Alfie and Vernon finish the garden for her. Billy visits and explains that he missed their date because he was in the hospital after an accident, and the person she saw was his triplet brother. Soon after, Alfie passes away. He was actually the owner of Bella's house, and has left it to her and his own house to Vernon. Bella, now in a relationship with Billy, publishes her picture book, titled This Beautiful Fantastic.

Cast 
 Jessica Brown Findlay as Bella Brown
 Tom Wilkinson as Alfie Stevenson, Brown's neighbour
 Andrew Scott as Vernon, chef
 Jeremy Irvine as Billy Tranter, inventor
 Anna Chancellor as Mrs. Bramble, librarian 
 Eileen Davies as Milly

Production 
Principal photography on the film began in London in July 2015.

Reception
On review aggregator website Rotten Tomatoes, the film holds an approval rating of 61% based on 23 reviews, and an average rating of 6.08/10. On Metacritic, the film has a weighted average score of 51 out of 100, based on 10 critics, indicating "mixed or average reviews".

Middling reviews from critics used the term “twee” with comparisons to Amélie. Negative reviews focused on having too many distracting questions, such as why Bella doesn’t just hire a gardener for a few days and the film’s depiction of troubled mental health as a charming eccentricity. Some reviews focused on taste, with Dennis Harvey calling the film a "formulaic crowd-pleaser", that audiences will either find the film sweet or too sweet. Sheri Linden calls the film "sweet but not saccharine" and Neil Genzlinger writes "enjoyable performances keep the tale from becoming too heavy-handed".

References

External links 
 
 
 
 This Beautiful Fantastic at Box Office Mojo
 This Beautiful Fantastic at The Numbers

2016 films
British romantic drama films
2016 romantic drama films
Films shot in London
Films set in London
Films about writers
Films about obsessive–compulsive disorder
2010s British films